Salmontail catfish is a name used for:

 Kibonde, Chrysichthys brachynema
 Arius graeffei, Arius leptaspis, and other catfish of Arius